Leeds is a tri-county municipality located in Jefferson, St. Clair, and Shelby counties in the State of Alabama and is an eastern suburb of Birmingham. As of the 2020 census, the population of the city was 12,324.

Leeds was founded in 1877, during the final years of the post-Civil War Reconstruction Era. It housed the workers and their families of Lehigh, a Portland cement manufacturing plant.

History

History
The War of 1812, geography, geology, and three cultures shaped the history of Leeds. Lying at the crossroads of ancient Native American paths in the center of Alabama, Leeds drew European settlers and their African-American slaves to a land of fertile growing seasons and rich sources of coal and mineral ore. The early settlers built churches and schools with many remaining in Cedar Grove, Oak Ridge, Ohanafeefee and Mt. Pleasant. The principal survey of Leeds was entered into Jefferson County Map Book 10, page 21, in 1908. The settlement, dating to 1818 and incorporating on April 27, 1887 as "Leeds", has existed along the banks of the Little Cahaba River; beside an historic stagecoach route; and along two large railroads for the greater part of American History.

James Hamilton, a Scottish-Irish American veteran of the War of 1812 and first sheriff of Shelby County, settled in Cedar Grove in 1816. John Richard Ingram Pashal Stewart, a Cherokee English teacher and American veteran of the War of 1812, settled at Ohanafeefee Village c.1840. At Oak Ridge in 1820 or 1821, European settlers formed Shiloh Cumberland Presbyterian Church, the first CPC congregation in middle Alabama. By 1887, the original railroad pioneers included free African-American settlers who came to work at the Leeds cement plant and the Central of Georgia as the Georgia Pacific railroads. Some gravitated to historic Mt. Pleasant Church where a handful of freed slaves had founded Scott City, Hillard Holley, Ciscero Davis, Jeff Harris, and Bill Johnson started Leeds Negro/Primary School in 1921.

Folklore
The tale of John Henry was believed to have originated in Leeds. In this folk story, John Henry, the "steel-drivin' man", races and wins against a steam engine in the laying of railroad that penetrates the Oak Mountain Tunnel in Leeds. Retired chemistry professor and folklorist John Garst, of the University of Georgia, has argued that the contest happened at the Coosa Mountain Tunnel or the Oak Mountain Tunnel of the Columbus and Western Railway (now part of Norfolk Southern Railway) in Leeds on September 20, 1887.

Based on documentation that corresponds with the account of C.C. Spencer, who claimed in the 1920s to have witnessed the contest, Garst speculates that John Henry may have been a man named Henry who was born a slave to P.A.L. Dabney, the father of the chief engineer of that railroad, in 1850. Since 2007, the city of Leeds has honored John Henry's legend during an annual festival held on the third weekend in September, the Leeds Downtown Folk Festival & John Henry Celebration.

Geography
Leeds is located at  (33.545592, -86.557388), primarily within Jefferson County.

The city is located east of Birmingham along Interstate 20, which runs north of the city. Access to the city is found from exits 140 and 144. U.S. Route 411 begins in the city from its junction with U.S. Route 78. US 411 leads northeast  to Moody.

In November 2019, the Alabama Political Reporter announced that the Superfund site at Interstate Lead Co. (ILCO) in Leeds was at risk due to flood hazards associated with climate change.

Demographics

2020 census

As of the 2020 United States census, there were 12,324 people, 4,792 households, and 3,388 families residing in the city.

2010 census
As of the census of 2010, there were 11,773 people and 4,818 households. The population density was 514.9 people per square mile. There were 5,221 housing units at an average density of 205.2 per square mile. The racial makeup of the city was 78.7% White, 14.3% Black or African American, 0.4% Native American, 0.6% Asian, 0.1% Pacific Islander, and 2% from two or more races. 6.6% of the population were Hispanic or Latino of any race.

There were 4,818 households, out of which 21.9% had children under the age of 18 living with them, 52% had a female householder with no husband present, and 30.5% were non-families. 14.8% had someone living alone who was 65 years of age or older. The average household size was 2.48. Not much family data was found.

In the city, the population was spread out, with 21.9% under the age of 18 and 14.8% who were 65 years of age or older. No gender ratios were found.

The median income for a household in the city was $44,149. The per capita income for the city was $22,716. About 14.6% of the population were below the poverty line.

Education
Leeds is served by the Leeds City School District.

In 2009, the City of Leeds Board of Education authorized the construction of two new schools - Leeds Middle School and Leeds High School. Construction began in 2009. The Leeds BOE also authorized the renovations of and additions to Leeds Elementary School, which began in 2008. These renovations included an expanded office and a new awning around the front of the school.

In 2013, Leeds Elementary School gained attention for asking parents for permission to administer corporal punishment to their children. Alabama is one of 19 states that allow corporal punishment in schools, and ranks third in the rate of students subjected to physical punishment.

Leeds Primary School was constructed in 2016 to house Pre-K through 2nd graders to ease overcrowding at its elementary school. The school opened that same year.

On December 4, 2008, the Leeds High School Greenwave football team won the Class 3A AHSAA State Football Championship and finished the year 15–0.   On February 28, 2009, the Greenwave basketball team won the 3A AHSAA State Basketball Championship. On December 6, 2010, the Greenwave football team won the Class 3A AHSAA State Football Championship and finishing the year 15–0. On December 5, 2014, the Greenwave football team won the Class 4A AHSAA State Football Championship and finished the year 14–1. On December 5, 2015, the Greenwave football team won the 4A AHSAA State Football Championship and finished the year 14–1. On February 14, 2015, the Greenwave wrestling team won the Class 1A-5A AHSAA State Wrestling Championship.

The Leeds High School Track and Field team has won several state championships.

The 2007 Leeds High School Softball team won the 3A state championship after winning six straight games from the loser's bracket.

Notable people
 Rebecca Bace, computer security expert and pioneer in intrusion detection
 Charles Barkley, Basketball Hall of Famer
 Chandler Champion, Miss Alabama (2013)
 Henry E. Erwin, U.S. Army Air Forces, Medal of Honor recipient, World War II
 Kenneth L. Farmer, Jr., U.S. Army major general (Retired); U.S. Army Deputy Surgeon General and Army Chief of Staff, Medical Command
 Nathan Glick, artist and illustrator
 Caitlín R. Kiernan, author and paleontologist
 William R. Lawley, Jr., U.S. Army Air Forces, Medal of Honor recipient, World War II
 Harry Lee, former Canadian Football League player
 Mark Martin, cartoonist
 Alford L. McLaughlin, U.S. Marine Corps, Medal of Honor recipient, Korean War
 Harry Walker, Major League Baseball player and manager. Two-time All Star and 1947 NL batting champion.
 Dixie Walker (pitcher) (Ewart Gladstone Walker), Major League Baseball player. Father of Dixie Walker (Fred E Walker, Sr.) and Harry Walker.

References

External links

Official website

Populated places established in 1877
Cities in Alabama
Cities in Jefferson County, Alabama
Cities in St. Clair County, Alabama
Cities in Shelby County, Alabama
Birmingham metropolitan area, Alabama
1877 establishments in Alabama